The  New York Giants season was the franchise's 69th season in the National Football League (NFL) and the first under head coach Dan Reeves, who was hired by the Giants after being fired by the Denver Broncos in the off-season. 

The Giants were looking to improve on their 6-10 mark from the previous year under former head coach Ray Handley and return to the playoffs for the first time since winning Super Bowl XXV in January 1991. Under Reeves’ watch, the Giants did exactly that, finishing with an 11-5 record and qualifying for the playoffs as one of the three Wild Card teams in the NFC. They defeated the Minnesota Vikings at home in their first playoff game, but were soundly defeated by the San Francisco 49ers in the Divisional Playoffs. 

After the season, star linebacker Lawrence Taylor announced his retirement from football. As Taylor was playing out his final season, another Giants defensive stalwart was entering the league; 1993 saw the debut of Texas Southern defensive end Michael Strahan in the team’s lineup. 

1993 was also the last season for veteran Giants quarterback Phil Simms; he was released following the season and after entertaining offers to continue his career, Simms elected to retire in 1994.

Offseason 
There was some significant roster turnover from 1992. Among the departures were veteran linebackers Carl Banks, who joined the Washington Redskins, and Pepper Johnson, who joined the Cleveland Browns; defensive end Leonard Marshall, who joined the New York Jets; and Super Bowl XXV MVP Ottis Anderson, who retired. 

Another major roster turnover move was at the quarterback position, which had been in flux since the end of the 1990 season. After Simms went down to an injury, Jeff Hostetler took over for him and led the Giants to their second Super Bowl victory. Handley had chosen Hostetler over Simms in 1991 to become the starter, but Simms eventually won the job back after Hostetler himself suffered an injury. Simms again assumed the position in 1992, but once again suffered a severe injury pressing Hostetler back into duty. Injuries also befell Hostetler, who recorded a winning record despite the team’s 6-10 finish. When the season ended and Reeves took over, he chose Simms as his starter and Hostetler was released

NFL Draft

Personnel

Staff

Roster

Regular season 
Simms started all 16 games in 1993, being one of only seven quarterbacks to do so, and led the Giants to a resurgent 11–5 season including a victory over the Minnesota Vikings in the playoffs. However, Simms underwent shoulder surgery after the 1993 season to repair a torn labrum. The surgery was successful, and team doctor Russell F. Warren's prognosis for recovery was excellent, and Simms was expected to be ready in time for training camp. However, later during that offseason, Simms was released by the Giants, and subsequently decided to retire. The Giants offense was coming off a sub-par 1992 season, so Dan Reeves and offensive coordinator George Henshaw added and adjusted schemes. The emphasis remained running the ball as the Full House and Power I formations were installed. Rodney Hampton and Phil Simms both made the pro bowl, each the driving force behind the offense. The Defense returned to its dominant ways; allowing an NFL-best 12.8 points per game, or 205 points all year. Lawrence Taylor would join Simms in retirement after the season, ending an era. The Giants finished the 1993 season first in overall defense and rushing offense.

The Giants played the Dolphins in Miami for the first time on December 5, only the fourth meeting between the clubs since the AFL-NFL merger. New York was scheduled to be the opponent for the Dolphins' first regular season game at Joe Robbie Stadium in 1987, but that game was cancelled by a players' strike.

The Giants qualified for the playoffs on December 12 with a win at Giants Stadium against the Colts, 35 years after the two teams met in "The Greatest Game Ever Played". However in week 18, the Cowboys and Giants met in the Meadowlands to conclude the regular season with huge stakes. The winner would win the NFC East and have home-field advantage as the NFC's #1 seed and have a week off, while the loser would have play an extra week and host a wild card game against the Minnesota Vikings as the NFC's #4 seed. The Giants lost to the Cowboys 16–13 in overtime, making their road to the Super Bowl much harder.

Schedule

Standings

Playoffs

NFC Wild Card Game 

A howling, gusting wind dominated the game as both teams could only score with the wind. However, the Giants managed to score two touchdowns, both by running back Rodney Hampton in the third quarter, to pull ahead for good.

This was both the first playoff game and the first playoff win for the Giants since Super Bowl XXV.

NFC Divisional Playoff 

49ers running back Ricky Watters rushed for 118 yards, caught 5 passes for 46 yards, and scored an NFL playoff record 5 touchdowns as San Francisco crushed the Giants, 44–3. This was the final NFL game for both Giants legends Lawrence Taylor and Phil Simms.

See also 
 List of New York Giants seasons

References 

 New York Giants on Pro Football Reference
 Giants on jt-sw.com

New York Giants seasons
New York Giants
New York Giants season
20th century in East Rutherford, New Jersey
Meadowlands Sports Complex